This is the discography for American hip hop musician OJ da Juiceman.

Studio albums

Mixtapes

Singles

As lead artist

As featured artist

Guest appearances

Notes

References 

Discographies of American artists
Hip hop discographies